Lost Creek can refer to several places:

Lost Creek (Feather River, South Fork), a California tributary of the South Fork Feather River with confluence at 
Lost Creek (Kansas), a stream in Bourbon and Linn counties
Lost Creek (Cedar Creek), a stream in Missouri
Lost Creek (Courtois Creek), a stream in Missouri
Lost Creek (Cuivre River), a stream in Missouri
Lost Creek (Grand River), a stream in Missouri
Lost Creek (Grindstone Creek), a stream in Missouri
Lost Creek (Meramec River), a stream in Missouri
Lost Creek (St. Francis River), a stream in Missouri
Lost Creek (Great Miami River), a stream in Ohio
Lost Creek (South Fork Little Butte Creek), a stream in the Rogue River basin in Oregon
Lost Creek (Middle Fork Willamette River), in Oregon
Lost Creek (Oregon), a tributary of the McKenzie River
Lost Creek (Pennsylvania), a tributary of the Juniata River
Lost Creek (Pit River), a California tributary of the Pit River (via Hat Creek) which contains the Lost Creek Falls
Lost Creek (South Platte River), a Colorado perennial tributary of the South Platte River (via Goose Creek)
Lost Creek Wilderness, a central Colorado wilderness area
Lost Creek, Texas, a census-designated place in Travis County
Lost Creek, West Virginia, a town in Harrison County
Lost Creek (British Columbia), a stream in British Columbia

Other
Lost Creek (film), a 2016 American horror drama film

See also

Loss Creek (disambiguation)